The women's 200 metre individual medley event at the 2014 Commonwealth Games as part of the swimming programme took place on 27 July at the Tollcross International Swimming Centre in Glasgow, Scotland.

The medals were presented by Louise Martin, Honorary Secretary of the Commonwealth Games Federation, Immediate Past Chair of Commonwealth Games Scotland and Vice-Chair of Glasgow 2014 and the quaichs were presented by Dr Fiona McEwan, Vice-Chair of Commonwealth Games Scotland.

Records
Prior to this competition, the existing world and Commonwealth Games records were as follows.

Results

Heats

Final

References

External links

Women's 200 metre individual medley
Commonwealth Games
2014 in women's swimming